Ototropis elegans is a shrub in the pea family (Fabaceae) native to Asia from Afghanistan to north-central China. Infraspecific taxa include:

Ototropis elegans subsp. elegans
Ototropis elegans subsp. wolohoense
Ototropis elegans var. handelii
Ototropis elegans var. nutans
Ototropis elegans f. albiflora

References

Desmodieae
Flora of Asia